Antonios Varthalitis, AA (1 January 1924 in   – 27 October 2007) was from 1962 to 2003 Catholic Archbishop of the Roman Catholic Archdiocese of Corfu, Zakynthos and Cephalonia.

Life 
Antonios Varthalitis joined the Congregation of the Assumption (Augustinians of the Assumption) in Athens. He studied theology and philosophy in Lyon. On 11 January 1953, Varthalitis was ordained as a Catholic priest. He served as a priest in the parish of Saints Peter and Paul in Piraeus and engaged in the ecumenical movement with the Greek Orthodox Church.

In 1962 he was named by Pope John XXIII as Archbishop of the Archdiocese of Corfu, Kefalonia and Zakynthos. From 1962 to 1964 Varthalitis participated of the I, II, III and IV sessions of the II Vatican Council. The episcopal ordination was done by Venediktos Printesis, Roman Catholic Archbishop of Athens. Pope John Paul II in 1992 named him the first Apostolic Vicar of Thessaloniki.

Varthalitis became involved in the Commission of the Bishops' Conferences of the European Community (COMECE) and the Council of European Bishops' Conferences (CCEE).

In 2003 his resignation was accepted by John Paul II.

External links 
 
 

Greek Roman Catholic archbishops
1924 births
2007 deaths
People from Poseidonia
Assumptionists
Roman Catholic archbishops of Corfu
20th-century Roman Catholic bishops in Greece
Greek expatriates in France